Georg Abraham Constantin von Arnim (Schloss Suckow, 10 December 1839 – Berlin, 7 July 1879), 5th Lord of the Fideicomis of Suckow in the Grand Duchy of Mecklenburg-Schwerin, Lord of Nemidchlof and Neu-Körtnitz, was a German Military and Nobleman, son of Georg Wilhelm von Arnim and wife Marie Josephine Ernestine Adamine Gräfin von Blumenthal.

Career
He was a Lieutenant of the Prussian Army and a Knight of Honour of the Order of St. John.

Marriage and children
He married secondly in Klützow on 13 September 1867 Rosalie Augusta Carolina Johanna Ulrika von Schnehen (Altenplatow, 26 September 1843 – Nemischhof, 22 November 1907), daughter of Friedrich Gustav Carl Ulrich Franz von Schnehen and wife Johanna Elisabeth Rosalie von Pieschel, and had issue, among whom a son Georg Gustav von Arnim.

References

1839 births
1879 deaths
Georg Abraham Constantin
Prussian Army personnel